, abbreviated as  or UTokyo, is a public research university located in Bunkyō, Tokyo, Japan. Established in 1877, the university was the first Imperial University and is currently a Top Type university of the Top Global University Project by the Japanese government.

UTokyo has 10 faculties, 15 graduate schools and enrolls about 30,000 students, about 4,200 of whom are international students. In particular, the number of privately funded international students, who account for more than 80%, has increased 1.75 times in the 10 years since 2010, and the university is focusing on supporting international students. Its five campuses are in Hongō, Komaba, Kashiwa, Shirokane and Nakano. 

It is considered to be the most selective and prestigious university in Japan. As of 2021, University of Tokyo's alumni, faculty members and researchers include seventeen prime ministers, 18 Nobel Prize laureates, four Pritzker Prize laureates, five astronauts, and a Fields Medalist.

History

The university was chartered by the Meiji government in 1877 under its current name by amalgamating older government schools for medicine, various traditional scholars and modern learning. It was renamed  in 1886, and then  in 1897 when the Imperial University system was created. In September 1923, an earthquake and the following fires destroyed about 750,000 volumes of the Imperial University Library. The books were the former possessions of Hoshino Hisashi before becoming part of the library of the university and were mainly about Chinese philosophy and history.

After Japan's defeat in World War II in 1947, it re-assumed its original name. With the start of the new university system in 1949, Todai swallowed up the former First Higher School (today's Komaba campus) and the former Tokyo Higher School, which thenceforth assumed the duty of teaching first- and second-year undergraduates, while the faculties on Hongo main campus took care of third- and fourth-year students.

Although the university was founded during the Meiji period, it has earlier roots in the Astronomy Agency (天文方; 1684), Shoheizaka Study Office (昌平坂学問所; 1797), and the Western Books Translation Agency (蕃書和解御用; 1811). These institutions were government offices established by the 徳川幕府 Tokugawa shogunate (1603–1867), and played an important role in the importation and translation of books from Europe.

According to The Japan Times, the university had 1,282 professors in February 2012. Of those, 58 were women. Comparing the number of professors in May 2022, there are 124 women among the 1,355 professors, which more than doubling. The university is steadily closing the gender gap, and by April 2021, half of its directors were women.

In the fall of 2012 and for the first time, the University of Tokyo started two undergraduate programs entirely taught in English and geared toward international students—Programs in English at Komaba (PEAK)—the International Program on Japan in East Asia and the International Program on Environmental Sciences. In 2014, the School of Science at the University of Tokyo introduced an all-English undergraduate transfer program called Global Science Course (GSC).

On May 28, 2021, the university's Institute for Cosmic Ray Research started construction of the "Hyper-Kamiokande" device, for a new world-leading international scientific research project which is set to start experiments in 2027.

On 15 January 2022, a stabbing incident resulted in 3 people being wounded. The attacker was arrested outside the campus gate. The incident took place before the national examination.

Successive Presidents of the University of Tokyo

Notes

Academics
The University of Tokyo is organized into 10 faculties and 15 graduate schools.

 Divisions with undergraduate and graduate programs
 College of Arts and Sciences and Graduate School of Arts and Sciences
 Faculty of Agriculture and Graduate School of Agricultural and Life Sciences
 Faculty of Economics and Graduate School of Economics
 Faculty of Education and Graduate School of Education
 Faculty of Engineering and Graduate School of Engineering
 Faculty of Law and Graduate Schools for Law and Politics
 Faculty of Letters and Graduate School of Humanities and Sociology
 Faculty of Medicine and Graduate School of Medicine
 Faculty of Pharmaceutical Sciences and Graduate School of Pharmaceutical Sciences
 Faculty of Science and Graduate School of Science
 Divisions with graduate programs only
 Graduate School of Frontier Sciences
 Graduate School of Information Science and Technology
 Graduate School of Interdisciplinary Information Studies
 Graduate School of Mathematical Sciences
 Graduate School of Public Policy (GraSPP)

Graduate programs
Todai Law School is considered one of the top law schools in Japan, ranking first in the number of successful candidates of Japanese Bar Examination in 2020. Eduniversal ranked Japanese business schools, and the Faculty of Economics in Todai is placed 4th in Japan (111th in the world).

Research
The University of Tokyo is considered a top research institution of Japan. It receives the largest amount of national grants for research institutions, receiving 40% more than the university with 2nd largest grants and 90% more than the university with 3rd largest grants. This massive financial investment from the Japanese government directly affects Todai's research outcomes. According to Thomson Reuters, Todai is the best research university in Japan. Its research excellence is especially distinctive in Physics (1st in Japan, 2nd in the world), Biology & Biochemistry (1st in Japan, 3rd in the world), Pharmacology & Toxicology (1st in Japan, 5th in the world), Materials Science (3rd in Japan, 19th in the world), Chemistry (2nd in Japan, 5th in the world), and Immunology (2nd in Japan, 20th in the world).

In the same article, it is also ranked 21st in terms of the quality of education by  funds per student.

Todai also has been recognized for its research in the social sciences and humanities. In January 2011, Repec ranked Todai's Economics department as Japan's best economics research university. And it is the only Japanese university within world top 100. Todai has produced 9 presidents of the Japanese Economic Association, the largest number in the association. Asahi Shimbun summarized the number of academic papers in Japanese major legal journals by university, and Todai was ranked top during 2005–2009.

Research institutes

 Institute of Medical Science
 Earthquake Research Institute
 Institute of Advanced Studies on Asia
 Institute of Social Science
 Institute of Industrial Science
 Historiographical Institute
 Institute of Molecular and Cellular Biosciences
 Institute for Cosmic Ray Research
 Institute for Solid State Physics
 Atmosphere and Ocean Research Institute
 Research Center for Advanced Science and Technology

The university's School of Science and the Earthquake Research Institute are both represented on the national Coordinating Committee for Earthquake Prediction.

Academic rankings and reputation

University of Tokyo (Todai) is considered to be the most selective and prestigious university in Japan and is counted as one of the best universities in the world.

Nikkei BP has been publishing a ranking system "Brand rankings of Japanese universities" every year, composed by the various indications related to the power of brand, and Todai has been 2nd in 2009–2010 in Greater Tokyo Area. The university has been ranked 1st during 2006–2010 in the ranking "Truly Strong Universities" by Toyo Keizai. In another ranking, Japanese prep school  ranked Todai as the best university in Japan. The University of Tokyo is the most difficult university in Japan, boasting the highest deviation value.

Todai was ranked second in the world, behind Harvard University, in Mines ParisTech: Professional Ranking of World Universities (2011), which measured universities' numbers of alumni holding CEO positions in Fortune Global 500 companies.

Academic Ranking of World Universities ranked the University of Tokyo 1st in Asia and 20th in the world in 2012.
Times Higher Education World University Rankings ranked the University of Tokyo 27th in the world in 2013 and 1st in the Asia University ranking in 2013. In 2015, Times Higher Education World University Rankings ranked the institution 23rd in the world. It ranks 12th in the world according to the Times Higher Education World Reputation Rankings 2016.
QS World University Rankings in 2011 ranked the University of Tokyo 25th in the world (in 2010 Times Higher Education World University Rankings and QS World University Rankings parted ways to produce separate rankings). In the 2011 QS Asian University Rankings, which employs a different methodology, the University of Tokyo came 4th. Currently, University of Tokyo holds ranks 9th & 11th respectively for Natural Sciences & Engineering, two of its traditionally strong disciplines.
In 2019, University of Tokyo ranked 24th among the universities around the world by SCImago Institutions Rankings.
Times Higher Education World Reputation Rankings ranked the University of Tokyo 12th in the world also 1st in Asia in 2016.
Global University Ranking ranked the University of Tokyo 3rd in the world and 1st in Asia.
Human Resources & Labor Review, a human competitiveness index & analysis published in Chasecareer Network, ranked the university 21st internationally and 1st in Asia in 2010.
Nature Index ranked the University of Tokyo #6 in 2015 and #8 in 2017 in its Annual Tables, which measure the largest contributors to papers published in 82 leading journals.
In the Nature Index Annual Tables 2021, the University of Tokyo was ranked 8th based on 1,308 Natural science research treatises published by the university. In the field of physical science treatises, it ranked second in the world among universities.
 In November 2018 Expertscape recognized it as #9 in the world for expertise in Pancreatic Cancer.
 University of Tokyo was ranked 26th among the world's best universities and 1st in Asia and Japan in 2019 according to the Top 500 Global Universities Rankings produced by CEOWORLD magazine.

Todai alumni are distinctively successful in Japanese industries. According to the 's 2010 rankings, graduates from Todai have the 12th best employment rate in 400 major companies in Japan. However, this lower ranking position is because of the large number of alumni who become government bureaucrats, which is more than double of alumni from any other universities.

Pass rate for bar exam
School of Law was 3rd out of all the 74 law schools in Japan according to the ratio, 78.91%, of the successful graduates who passed the bar examinations from 2007 to 2017 on average.

In 2019, School of Law became 3rd out of all the 72 law schools in Japan according to the ratio, 56.30%, of the successful graduates who passed the bar examination.

Evaluation from Business World

Gender imbalance
In 2019, enrollment figures from the University of Tokyo reveal that 5,267 of 24,674 (21.3%) domestic students are female. The ratio is more equal among international students, where 1,465 of 3,735 (39.2%) students are female. The gender imbalance is more stark among the faculty, where 7.8 percent of professors are female.

Within student life, some clubs excluded female students even though the university discourages such a practice. Of more than 30 tennis clubs at the University of Tokyo, even though no clubs announced that they reject female students, only two actively recruited women, allowing them to join without passing the exam required for male applicants. In 2020, the Orientation Committee announced that clubs that did not admit female students' membership could not join circle recruitment events.

Since 2017, the University of Tokyo has paid thirty thousand yen in housing allowances for female students exclusively in order to gain more female applicants from distant regions.

Campus

Hongo campus 
The main Hongo campus occupies the former estate of the Maeda family, Edo period feudal lords of Kaga Province. One of the university's best known landmarks, Akamon (the Red Gate), is a relic of this era. The symbol of the university is the ginkgo leaf, from the trees found throughout the area. The Hongo campus also hosts the University of Tokyo's annual May Festival.

Sanshiro Pond
, university's Hongo campus, dates to 1615. After the fall of the Osaka Castle, the shōgun gave this pond and its surrounding garden to Maeda Toshitsune. With further development of the garden by Maeda Tsunanori, it became known as one of the most beautiful gardens in Edo (Now Tokyo), with the traditional eight landscapes and eight borders, and known for originality in artificial pond, hills, and pavilions. It was at that time known as Ikutoku-en (Garden of Teaching Virtue). The pond's contours are in the shape of the character kokoro or shin (heart), and thus its official name is Ikutoku-en Shinjiike. It has been commonly called Sanshiro Pond after the title of Natsume Sōseki's novel Sanshiro.

Komaba Campus

One of the five campuses of the University of Tokyo, the Komaba Campus is home to the College of Arts and Sciences, the Graduate School of Arts and Sciences, the Graduate School of Mathematical Sciences, and a number of advanced research facilities and campus services. This is the campus where all the freshmen and sophomores of the University of Tokyo spend their college life. The University of Tokyo is the only university in Japan which has a system of two years of general education before students can choose and move on to special fields of study. The Komaba Campus is the cornerstone of general education, and was designated as the "center of excellence" for three new areas of research by the Ministry of Education and Science. There are currently over 7,000 students (freshmen and sophomores) enrolled in the general education courses, about 450 students (juniors and seniors) pursuing their specialties in the College of Arts and Sciences, and 1,400 graduate students in the advanced study.

Kashiwa Campus
One of the five campuses of the University of Tokyo, the Kashiwa Campus is home to the Graduate School of Frontier Sciences and a number of advanced research facilities and campus services. The Kashiwa Campus also hosts the Institute for Cosmic Ray Research (ICRR), Institute for Solid State Physics, and Atmosphere and Ocean Research Institute, which is entirely dedicated to postgraduate studies.

Shirokanedai Campus
The relatively small Shirokanedai Campus hosts the Institute of Medical Science of the University of Tokyo (IMSUT), which is entirely dedicated to postgraduate studies. The campus is focused on genome research, including among its facilities the Human Genome Center (HGC), which have at its disposal the largest supercomputer in the field.

Nakano Campus

Notable alumni and faculty members 

The university has produced many notable people. 15 prime ministers of Japan have studied at the University of Tokyo. Former prime minister Kiichi Miyazawa ordered Japanese government agencies to reduce the rate of employees who had attended the university's law faculty to below 50 percent due to concerns about diversity in the bureaucracy.
13 alumni of University of Tokyo have received the Nobel Prize.
Yasunari Kawabata, Literature, 1968
Leo Esaki, Physics, 1973
Eisaku Satō, Peace, 1974
Kenzaburō Ōe, Literature, 1994
Masatoshi Koshiba, Physics, 2002
Yoichiro Nambu, Physics, 2008
Ei-ichi Negishi, Chemistry, 2010
Takaaki Kajita, Physics, 2015
Yoshinori Ohsumi, Medicine, 2016
Syukuro Manabe, Physics, 2021

Two alumni of University of Tokyo have received the Fields Medal or Gauss Prize.
Kunihiko Kodaira, 1954
Kiyosi Itô, 2006

Four have received the Pritzker Architecture Prize:
Toyo Ito
Kenzo Tange
Fumihiko Maki
Arata Isozaki

Nobel laureates

Scientists

See also

Imperial College of Engineering
Earthquake engineering
Kikuchi Dairoku
Koishikawa Botanical Gardens
Nikko Botanical Garden
The University of Tokyo Library
The University Museum, The University of Tokyo
International Journal of Asian Studies – published in association with the Institute for Advanced Studies on Asia, University of Tokyo

References

Further reading
 Kato, Mariko, "Todai still beckons nation's best, brightest but goals diversifying", Japan Times, August 11, 2009, p. 3.
 Kersten, Rikki. "The intellectual culture of postwar Japan and the 1968–1969 University of Tokyo Struggles: Repositioning the self in postwar thought." Social Science Japan Journal 12.2 (2009): 227–245.
 Marshall, Byron K. Academic Freedom and the Japanese Imperial University, 1868–1939 (University of California Press, 1992).
 Takashi, Tachibana, and Richard H. Minear. Tokyo University and the War (2017), on world war II; online.

External links

University of Tokyo

 
Kemigawa
Olympic modern pentathlon venues
Olympic weightlifting venues
Japanese national universities
National Seven Universities
Bunkyō
Educational institutions established in 1877
1877 establishments in Japan
Universities and colleges in Tokyo
American football in Japan